Constantia Park (Afrikaans: Constantiapark) is a residential suburb in the city of Pretoria in the Gauteng province of South Africa.  It borders other upmarket areas like Erasmuskloof, Garsfontein, Waterkloof Glen and Lynnwood Glen.

Constantia Park is positioned near the N1 highway and major shopping malls Menlyn Park, Menlyn Retail Park, coffee bars, restaurants, cafés and Constantiapark Library. It is the site of Constantia Park Primary School, Laerskool Constantiapark and lies only 6 km from the University of Pretoria.

References

Suburbs of Pretoria